Clara Hampson Ueland (October 10, 1860 - March 1, 1927) was an American community activist and suffragist. She was the first president of the Minnesota League of Women Voters and worked to advance public welfare legislation.

Biography

Personal life
Clara Hampson was born on October 10, 1860 in Akron, Ohio. She married lawyer Andreas Ueland in 1885. The couple and their three oldest daughters moved into a sixteen-room house on the south shore of Lake Calhoun in 1891. She was the mother of writer Brenda Ueland, who wrote a biography of her later published as O Clouds, Unfold!.

Professional life and activism
As president of the Minnesota League of Women Voters, Ueland advocated for women's suffrage. Ueland is known for having argued "Minnesota denies the vote to criminals, lunatics, idiots, and women. Is this chivalry?" Ueland was president of the Minnesota Woman Suffrage Association (MWSA) from 1914 to 1920. With ratification of the 19th amendment, the MWSA became the Minnesota League of Women Voters and Ueland served as its first president.

Ueland travelled to Connecticut in 1920 as part of the "Emergency Suffrage Corps'" to protest Governor Marcus H. Holcomb's refusal to call a special session to ratify the suffrage amendment. In 1921, she was appointed chair of the Minneapolis fundraising committee for the Woodrow Wilson Foundation. She was presented the pen that Minnesota Governor Joseph A. A. Burnquist used when signing the presidential suffrage bill. In 1925, Ueland criticized Republican foreign policy and "back-door" cooperation with the League of Nations, saying "We have got to spread the gospel among the women, telling them that they are paying too much for cotton and woolen goods, for aluminumware and that the country cannot recover from hard times unless we reduce the tariff."

Ueland taught kindergarten in her home and worked to establish kindergartens in the schools of Minneapolis.

Death
She died after being struck by a truck as she was crossing the street near her home on March 1, 1927.

References

External links 
Interview with Barbara Stuhler, author of Gentle Warriors: Clara Ueland and the Minnesota Struggle for Women Suffrage, NORTHERN LIGHTS Minnesota Author Interview TV Series #358 (1996)

1860 births
1927 deaths
American suffragists
People from Akron, Ohio
People from Minneapolis
Road incident deaths in Minnesota
Activists from Ohio
Activists from Minnesota
Pedestrian road incident deaths